Sclerophrys kerinyagae is a species of toad in the family Bufonidae. It is found in central Ethiopia, Kenya, northern Tanzania, and eastern Uganda. Common names Keith's toad and Kerinyaga toad have been coined for it.

Description
Adult males measure  and adult females  in snout–vent length. It is similar in overall appearance to Sclerophrys regularis. The snout is obtusely rounded. The tympanum is distinct and vertically oval. The parotoid glands are parallel and almost touching the eyes. The toes are about one-third webbed. The upper surfaces and the flanks are covered with conical warts that are tipped with sharp, brown, cornified spinules. The skin of the lower surface is coarsely granular. Males have a single, subgular vocal sac.

The male advertisement call is more rapidly pulsed (38–48 pulses per second) than in Sclerophrys regularis (13–18 pulses per second).

Habitat and conservation
Breeding takes place in permanent pools, rain-fed temporary pools, and flooded fields in montane grassland. It is a common species that is not threatened overall, although it suffers from habitat degradation resulting from human expansion and settlement as well from overgrazing by livestock. It occurs in a number of protected areas.

References

kerinyagae
Frogs of Africa
Amphibians of Ethiopia
Amphibians of Kenya
Amphibians of Tanzania
Amphibians of Uganda
Amphibians described in 1968
Taxonomy articles created by Polbot